The Johnson Geo Centre is a geological interpretation centre located on Signal Hill in St. John's, Newfoundland and Labrador, Canada. The museum is named for philanthropist Paul Johnson and opened in 2002.

Building Design 
Most of the centre is located underground, in an excavated glacial formation that shows the exposed bedrock of the hill. 

The building is designed to take advantage of the geological features of Signal Hill where most of the structure is below ground exposing natural rock formations. The area was originally a peat filled area that was stripped of overburden and a glass-encased structure of 2.5 stories was built atop the excavation. The building was built through the Johnson Family Foundation at a cost of $11 million. The building utilizes a heating and cooling system via six geothermal wells drilled to a depth of 500 feet.

Museum Content 
Visitors travel a 3.7 billion year timeline, exploring themes such as continental drift, glaciation, earthquakes and volcanoes.

The site also includes the outdoor Johnson GEO-VISTA Park, which shows how stone was used throughout Newfoundland and Labrador's history, including a replica of a root cellar, graveyard, and house chimney.

Affiliations 
The Museum is affiliated with: Canadian Association of Science Centres (CASC), Association of Science-Technology Centers (ASTC). CMA,  CHIN, and Virtual Museum of Canada.

Gallery

References

External links 
 Johnson Geo Centre

Museums in St. John's, Newfoundland and Labrador
Natural history museums in Canada
Geology museums in Canada